OME Care (formerly Pathway Genomics) is a privately held global precision medical diagnostic and home-care company with mobile applications. Based in San Diego, California, the company offers both at-home genetic testing and Artificial Intelligence to consumers and physicians to support the treatment of a variety of health conditions. The test menu ranges from pharmacogenomics testing for well-known drugs like Plavix, codeine, lamotrigine, to general health and wellness, testing which includes information on a number of health conditions including obesity management, skincare, and type 1 and type 2 diabetes and hypertension. The company has also applied for an FDA EUA fast-track on a multiplex Covid-19 and influenza RT-PCR diagnostic test.

OME care owns and operates a clinical laboratory, accredited by the College of American Pathologists and Clinical Laboratory Improvement Amendments.

History
The company was founded with the vision to make “home-care genetic testing and personalized medicine accessible and affordable to everyone.” OmeCare testing services cover a variety of conditions including obesity, cardiac health, inherited diseases, nutrition and exercise response, as well as drug response.

In addition to continual testing improvements and new testing developments, OME Care is also currently developing OME. OME is the “world’s only mobile healthcare consumer application with artificial intelligence to help provide consumers with personalized health and wellness information.

As of January 2019, Pathway Genomics was acquired by OME Wellness and renamed OME Care.

IBM partnership
In 2014, IBM Watson Group announced its partnership with Pathway Genomics, to help “deliver the first-ever cognitive consumer-facing app based on genetics from a user’s personal makeup.” The mobile app, subsequently named OME, is the first of its kind to merge artificial intelligence and deep learning, powered by IBM Watson, with personal genetic information. It provides users with personalized health and wellness information based on the individual’s health history.

Executives
OmeCare’ executives include Michael Nova, M.D. (chief innovation officer and founder) and Michael H. Cox, CIPP (Privacy SoCal Privacy Consultants).

See also
 Single-nucleotide polymorphism
 Pharmacogenomics
 Genetic counseling
 Genomic counseling

References

Biotechnology companies of the United States
Privately held companies based in California
Biotechnology companies established in 2008
Companies based in San Diego
2008 establishments in California
American companies established in 2008